Tanoli Colony, or Jalla is a town near Mailsi, district Vehari, Punjab Pakistan on the bank of the Sutlej river.

Location
The exact location is N+29° 43' 7", E+72° 8' 4".

References

Populated places in Vehari District